Étienne Chatiliez  (born 17 June 1952) is a French film director. He was born in Roubaix, France.

After starting out directing many advertising clips, he is now a well-known director of feature-length films with some success.

Filmography 
 1988 - Life Is a Long Quiet River
 1990 - Tatie Danielle
 1995 - Happiness Is in the Field
 2000 - Drugs!
 2000 - La Famille médicament
 2001 - Tanguy
 2004 - La confiance règne
 2008 - Agathe Cléry
 2012 - L'oncle Charles

Awards 
 Cesar for Best Writing
 Cesar for Best Director
 Cesar for Best Advertising Film

External links 
 

French film directors
1952 births
Living people
People from Roubaix